The Butuan–Cagayan de Oro–Iligan Road, or Butuan–Cagayan de Oro–Iligan–Tukuran Road, is a , two-to-six lane major thoroughfare, connecting the provinces of Agusan del Norte, Misamis Oriental, Lanao del Norte, and Zamboanga del Sur.

Route description

Butuan to Cagayan de Oro 

The highway starts at the junction with the Maharlika Highway (Surigao-Butuan National Highway) in Ampayon, Butuan. In the province of Agusan del Norte, including Butuan, it is alternatively known as Agusan–Misamis Oriental Road. It then crosses the Agusan River via Magsaysay Bridge and traverses the poblacion area of Butuan as J.C. Aquino Avenue. Past Butuan, it soon enters the coastal municipalities of Buenavista, Nasipit, and Carmen as it follows near the Agusan del Norte's coast with Butuan Bay before reaching the province of Misamis Oriental.

At Misamis Oriental, it traverses Magsaysay, the city of Gingoog (where it is locally known as J.J. Ganaban Avenue), Medina, Talisayan, Balingoan, Kinoguitan, Sugbongcogon, Binuangan, Salay, Lagonglong, Balingasag, Jasaan, and Tagoloan as it follows the provincial coastline with Gingoog Bay and Macajalar Bay.

Cagayan de Oro to Iligan 

The highway enters Cagayan de Oro, where it intersects with Sayre Highway. It would then traverse the downtown as Claro M. Recto Avenue. It then continues its course to the west towards other settlements of Misamis Oriental such as Opol, El Salvador, Alubijid, Laguindingan (where the highway is connected to the Laguindingan Airport), Gitagum, Libertad, Initao, Naawan, Manticao, and Lugait. The road is named Misamis Oriental–Maria Cristina Boundary Road.

Iligan to Tukuran 
The highway then enters the city of Iligan, where it is alternatively known as the Misamis Oriental-Ma. Cristina Boundary Road from near the city boundary with Lugait, Misamis Oriental to Iligan–Marawi Road in barangay Maria Cristina and Overton-Buru-un Boundary Road from thereon to the city boundary with Linamon, Lanao del Norte at Agus Bridge. Traversing the downtown, it is also known as Andres Bonifacio Avenue from Mandulog Bridge over Mandulog River to Mariano Badelles Sr. Street and Roxas Avenue, which traverses the downtown, from thereon to Tubod Bridge over Iligan River.

Entering Linamon, it becomes alternatively known as the Linamon–Zamboanga Road. Following the province's coastline with Iligan Bay and Panguil Bay, it later traverses other costal towns such as Kauswagan, Bacolod, Maigo, Kolambugan, Tubod, and Baroy. It then veers away from the coast towards the towns of Lala and Kapatagan.

It soon enters Zamboanga del Sur as the Aurora–Tukuran segment of Lanao–Pagadian–Zamboanga City Road at the town of Aurora. At the Aurora Junction, it intersects with Ozamiz–Pagadian Road and turns south, alternatively as the Aurora–Tukuran Road. It then traverses the mountainous terrain and enters Tukuran, where it ends at a junction with Maharlika Highway.

History 
During the American colonial era, the highway's section from Butuan to Iligan was part of Highway 1 in Mindanao, while the section from Butuan to Tukuran was part of Highway 7. By 2014, the highway was designated by the Department of Public Works and Highways as N9.

Intersections

References

External links 
 Department of Public Works and Highways 
 DPWH Road Atlas 

Roads in Agusan del Norte
Roads in Misamis Oriental
Roads in Lanao del Norte
Roads in Zamboanga del Sur